The 2009 UAB Blazers football team represented the University of Alabama at Birmingham in the 2009 NCAA Division I FBS football season. They played their home games at Legion Field in Birmingham, Alabama and competed in the East Division of Conference USA (C-USA). The Blazers finished the season 5–7 and 4–4 in C-USA play.

Schedule

Game summaries

Rice

To open the 2009 season, UAB quarterback Joe Webb would have a record setting day in leading the Blazers to this 44–24 victory over the Owls. For the game, Webb would set both a school and Conference USA record for rushing yards by a quarterback in a single game with 194. For the game, Webb would also complete 12 of 15 passes for another 221 yards and a pair of touchdowns in gaining 415 yards of total offense on the afternoon. For his efforts, Webb was named Conference USA Offensive Player of the Week.

SMU

Following an opening week win, the Blazers would fall by a final score of 33–35 to the Mustangs of SMU. After falling behind by a score of 28–7 at the half, the Blazers would rally to within a point of SMU by the end of the third quarter. The Blazers would fall late in the fourth following a failed two-point conversion that would have tied the game at 35 with 00:13 remaining in the game. For the game Webb would rush for 97 yards and a single touchdown in addition to throwing for 226 yards and a pair of touchdowns.

Troy

For the second week in a row, the Blazers would fall, and this time it was by a final score of 14–27 on the road to the Trojans of Troy. For the game, UAB only scored on a pair of Josh Zahn field goals and a single, 17-yard Joe Webb touchdown pass in the fourth.

Texas A&M

Traveling to College Station to face the Aggies in the evening, the Blazers would fall by a final score of 56–19. For the game, UAB scored on a pair of Josh Zahn field goals, a 10-yard Joe Webb touchdown run in the third and on a 60-yard David Isabelle run in the fourth.

Southern Miss

Following three consecutive losses in addition to coming off a short week, the Blazers would defeat Southern Miss for the first time in school history on a Thursday night by a final score of 30–17. UAB would open the scoring with a 27-yard Josh Zahn field goal and a 31-yard Joe Webb touchdown run in the first, only to have the Golden Eagles score 10 in the second to tie the game at the half. In the third, Webb would hit Anderson for a 21-yard touchdown in the third to take a 17–10 lead into the fourth. Zahn would hit a pair of field goals (51 & 32 yards) and Hiram Atwater would seal the game late following a 40-yard interception return for a touchdown.

Personnel

Roster

Coaching staff
 Neil Callaway – Head Coach
 Kim Helton – Offensive coordinator/tight ends
 Eric Schumann – Defensive coordinator/safeties
 Corey Barlow – Cornerbacks
 Tim Bowens – Receivers
 Lorenzo Costantini – Defensive line
 Steve Davenport – Running backs
 Will Friend – Offensive line
 Tyson Helton – Quarterbacks/recruiting coordinator
 Tyson Summers – Linebackers
 Steve Martin – Strength and Conditioning/Football & Baseball
 Josh Lee – Director of Football Operations

References

UAB
UAB Blazers football seasons
UAB Blazers football